WSHC is a non-commercial educational college radio station licensed to Shepherdstown, West Virginia, serving the Shepherdstown/Sharpsburg area.  WSHC is owned and operated by Shepherd University.

History
WSHC is a student-run facility. It is located in the basement of Knutti Hall, on Shepherd University's campus. WSHC also boasts special programming, including Eclectic Weekends (jazz, blues, classics). The station has a 30+ year history of supporting the local music scene.

WSHC became an affiliate of West Virginia Public Broadcasting in 2017, both to alleviate WVEP's coverage issues in the far Eastern Panhandle and to fill time not normally occupied by student programming. The station began carrying WVPB's feed of Morning Edition on weekdays and eight hours of WVPB programming on weekends (6 a.m.–10 a.m., 8 p.m.–midnight) effective September 1, 2017. WSHC later added All Things Considered in April 2018.

References

External links
 89.7 WSHC Online
 

SHC
SHC
Radio stations established in 1974
1974 establishments in West Virginia